Seal River may refer to one of several rivers:

Canada
Seal River (Manitoba), a tributary of Hudson Bay and a Canadian Heritage River
Seal River (Ontario), a right tributary of the Kesagami River

United States - Alaska
Seal River (Bering Glacier)
Seal River (Cook Inlet)

See also
Little Seal River (Ontario)